Events in the year 1923 in Portugal.

Incumbents
President: António José de Almeida
Prime Minister: António Maria da Silva

Events
Disestablishment of the Reconstitution Party, the Republican Liberal Party and the National Republican Party.

Arts and entertainment

Sports
Amarante FC founded
S.C. Covilhã founded
Louletano D.C. founded
A.C. Marinhense founded

Births

19 January – Eugénio de Andrade, poet (d. 2005)
15 July – Francisco de Andrade, sailor and Olympic medalist.
10 September – Alfredo Nobre da Costa, engineer and politician (died 1996)
16 September – Fernando Lanhas, painter (died 2012)

Deaths
 

11 August – Francisco Joaquim Ferreira do Amaral, naval commander and politician (b. 1843).

References

 
1920s in Portugal
Portugal
Years of the 20th century in Portugal
Portugal